Tolfenamic acid (Clotam, Tufnil) is a member of the anthranilic acid derivatives (or fenamate) class of NSAID drugs discovered by scientists at Medica Pharmaceutical Company in Finland.  Like other members of the class, it is a COX inhibitor and prevents formation of prostaglandins.

It is used in the UK as a treatment for migraine. It is generally not available in the US. It is available in some Asian, Latin American and European countries as a generic drug for humans and for animals.

References

External links 
 Tolfenamic acid information (Diseases Database)

Nonsteroidal anti-inflammatory drugs
Antipyretics
Analgesics
Chloroarenes
Anthranilic acids
GABAA receptor positive allosteric modulators